The small white-winged flying fox (Desmalopex microleucopterus) is a species of megabat in the family Pteropodidae. It is known from Mindoro Island, in the Philippines. Only 13 specimens have ever been found; one in 1998 and the others in 2006.

References

Desmalopex
Bats of Southeast Asia
Mammals described in 2008